Naber is a surname. Notable people with the surname include:

Alice Naber-Lozeman (born 1971), Dutch Olympic eventing rider
Bob Naber (1929–1998), American basketball player
Brian Naber (born 1949), American football coach
Gijs Naber (born 1980), Dutch actor
Herman Naber (1826–1909), American farmer, politician, and jurist
Johanna Naber (1859–1941), Dutch feminist, historian and author
John Naber (born 1956), American swimmer
Omar Naber (born 1981), Slovenian singer, songwriter and guitar player
Stephanie Al-Naber (born 1988), Jordanian footballer
Yousef Al-Naber (born 1989), Jordanian footballer 

See also
NABERS
Nabor (disambiguation)

References